Paul Mankiewitz (born 7 November 1857 in Mühlhausen; died 22 June 1924 on his estate Selchow near Storkow) was a German bank manager and, from 1919 to 1923 chairman of Deutsche Bank.

Life 
After an apprenticeship at the Gustav Hanau banking house in Mülheim, Mankiewitz joined Deutsche Bank's head office in  Berlin in 1879. In 1891, he became a deputy member of the board and joined the Society of Friends. In 1898, Mankiewitz moved up to the management board of Deutsche Bank and, together with Oscar Wassermann, headed its stock exchange business in 1912. From 1919 to 1923, he was chairman ('Sprecher') of the bank's board.

Mankiewitz was involved in the financing of Rhenish-Westphalian heavy industry. He was a member of the supervisory board of Phönix AG für Bergbau und Hüttenbetrieb. He also served on the advisory boards of several insurance companies. He was chairman of the board of "Kronos", Deutsche Lebensversicherungs-AG, Berlin, and the deputy chairmanship of Accumulatorenfabrik AG, Berlin.

During World War I, he advised the Reichsbank on financing the war and, after the end of the war, on dealing with reparations claims. He set up financial aid that helped many students at German universities and technical institutes.

Mankiewitz was a member of Deutsche Bank's management board for almost forty-five years.

Art 
Mankiewitz's portrait was painted by Max Liebermann.

Legacy 
Paul Mankiewitz was married to Anna Mankiewitz (née Tarlau)  and together they had had three sons:

 Werner Mankiewitz (Berlin, 3 April 1893 - Buenos Aires, 11 November 1962) a banker and partner in the private bank J. Dreyfus & Co. When the Nazis came to power, Werner fled to Argentina.
Hans Mankiewitz (born 14 November 1894) a merchant and director of the Deutsche Treuhandgesellschaft für Warenverkehr. Hans emigrated to Great Britain;
Kurt Mankiewitz (born 24 May 1891; died 1974 in Los Angeles): an engineer who emigrated to the USA where he changed his name to Curt Emanuel Mankin .

Paul Mankiewitz was of the Jewish faith. His children fled Nazi Germany and survived, however, his wife's brother Richard was deported and killed in the Holocaust. The grave of the Mankiewitz family is located in the Jewish cemetery in Berlin-Weißensee.

Sources

Literature

External links 

 Biografie der Historischen Gesellschaft der Deutschen Bank

1924 deaths
1857 births
Deutsche Bank people
German bankers
People from Mühlhausen
Jewish art collectors
19th-century German businesspeople